To Find Me Gone is the second studio album by Andy Cabic's San Francisco based band Vetiver.
The cover features a holographic print from American Artist Galen Pehrson.

Track listing
 "Been So Long" – 3:58
 "You May Be Blue" – 4:41
 "No One Word" – 6:13
 "Idle Ties" – 4:33
 "I Know No Pardon" – 6:53
 "Maureen" – 3:32
 "The Porter" – 2:18
 "Double" – 5:13
 "Red Lantern Girls" – 6:49
 "Lost & Found" (bonus track) – 5:24
 "Won't Be Me" – 4:22
 "Busted" (bonus track) – 3:32
 "Down At El Rio" – 5:16

2006 albums
FatCat Records albums
Vetiver albums